Hatto Beyerle (born 20 June 1933) is a German-Austrian chamber musician, conductor and university professor.

Life 
Born in Frankfurt, Beyerle studied viola at the Hochschule für Musik Freiburg with Ulrich Koch, the violin with Ricardo Odnoposoff in Vienna, musical composition with Alfred Uhl and conducting with Hans Swarowsky.

In 1960 he was co-founder of the chamber orchestra Wiener Solisten with which he undertook numerous concert tours. In 1970 he founded the Alban Berg Quartet together with Günter Pichler. From 1982 to 1998, he was a member of L'Ensemble.

Beyerle worked from 1964 to 1987 as Professor for Viola and Chamber Music at the University of Music and Performing Arts Vienna.

Since 1987, he has been professor at the Hochschule für Musik, Theater und Medien Hannover and from 1990 to 2004 also professor at the City of Basel Music Academy. Since 1998 he has regularly given master classes at the Fiesole School of Music (in Florence) and guest classes for viola and chamber music in the USA and Canada.

From 1985 to 1998 Beyerle was conductor of the Konzertvereinigung of the Konzerthaus, Vienna.

In 2004 Beyerle was the initiator of the European Chamber Music Academy and artistic director of the Europäischen Kulturforums Grossraming (Austria).

References

External links 
 Discography on Discogs
 Hatto Beyerle bei ECMA
 ECMA Tutors - Hatto Beyerle (viola) (YouTube)

1933 births
Living people
Musicians from Frankfurt
German classical violists
Academic staff of the Hochschule für Musik, Theater und Medien Hannover
20th-century German musicians
20th-century violists